Yu Shuai (born 28 June 1989) is a Chinese footballer currently playing as a central defender for Heilongjiang Ice City.

Career statistics

Club
.

References

1989 births
Living people
Chinese footballers
Association football defenders
China League One players
China League Two players
Shandong Taishan F.C. players
Shenzhen F.C. players
Inner Mongolia Zhongyou F.C. players
Shaanxi Chang'an Athletic F.C. players
21st-century Chinese people